William David Knowles (16 February 1908 – 23 November 2000) was a Progressive Conservative party member of the House of Commons of Canada. He was born in Langton, Ontario and became a teacher by career.

He was first elected at the Norfolk—Haldimand riding in the 1968 general election, defeating Jack Roxburgh. He was re-elected there in the 1972 and 1974 federal elections and completed his term in the 30th Parliament before leaving federal political office.

External links
 

1908 births
2000 deaths
Canadian schoolteachers
Members of the House of Commons of Canada from Ontario
People from Norfolk County, Ontario
Progressive Conservative Party of Canada MPs